Animalia is an illustrated children's book by Graeme Base. It was originally published in 1986, followed by a tenth anniversary edition in 1996, and a 25th anniversary edition in 2012. Over four million copies have been sold worldwide. A special numbered and signed anniversary edition was also published in 1996, with an embossed gold jacket.

Synopsis
Animalia is an alliterative alphabet book and contains twenty-six illustrations, one for each letter of the alphabet. Each illustration features an animal from the animal kingdom (A is for alligator and armadillo, B is for butterfly, etc.) along with a short poem utilizing the letter of the page for many of the words. The illustrations contain many other objects beginning with that letter that the reader can try to identify (however, there are not necessarily "a thousand things, or maybe more", as the author states). As an additional challenge, the author has hidden a picture of himself as a child in every picture.
Here are some of the things in each picture that are truly different (the alligator in the A section is wearing an apron featuring the alphabet, which the book is about, and this section also features the author's home country, Australia):

Note: This list is incomplete.

Aa

1. Astronaut 🧑‍🚀

2. Album 💿

3. Admiral

4. Archdiocese

5. Actor

6. Actress

7. Aborigine

8. Athlete

9. Acrobat

10. Apple 🍎

11. Acorn

12. Apricot

13. Avocado 🥑

14. Adder

15. Albatross

16. Antelope

17. Anteater

18. Aardvark

19. Anvil

20. Afghan hound

21. Affenpinscher

22. Airedale terrier

23. Aqueduct

24. Ant 🐜

25. Abacus 🧮

26. Asparagus

27. Artichoke

28. Accordion 🪗

29. Anchor ⚓️

30. Anemone

31. Axe 🪓

32. Angel 👼

33. Algebra

34. Atlas

35. Apron

36. Alien 👽

37. Ambulance 🚑

38. Antenna

Bb

36. Bumblebee 🐝

37. Bobolink

38. Bear 🐻

39. Bonnet

40. Barbed wire

41. Brambles

42. Bulrushes

43. Baboon

44. Bassoon

45. Brontosaurus 🦕

46. Budgerigar

47. Bomb 💣

48. Brain 🧠

49. Brick 🧱

50. Basket 🧺

51. Basketball 🏀

52. Basketball hoop

53. Baseball ⚾️

54. Baseball bat

55. Backgammon

56. Ballpoint pen 🖋️

57. Bagpipes

58. Bicycle 🚲

59. Barrel

60. Bell 🛎

61. Boot 🥾

62. Button

63. Blueberries 🫐

64. Belt

65. Bugle

66. Bull 🐂

67. Bucket 🪣

68. Bellows

69. Boomerang 🪃

70. Bathtub 🛁

71. Bone 🦴

72. Bush

73. Bottle 🍼

74. Banana 🍌

75. Brush

76. Binoculars

77. Barracuda

78. Buddha

79. Battery 🔋

80. Broom 🧹

81. Bat (animal) 🦇

82. Boy 👦

83. Bungalow

Cc

82. Crab 🦀

83. Chair 🪑

84. Crane 🏗

85. Caterpillar 🐛

86. Canoe 🛶

87. Computer 💻

88. Collar

89. Camera 📷

90. Concertina

91. Cap 🧢

92. Cheetah 🐆

93. Chain ⛓

94. Cassette

95. Crocodile 🐊

96. Cone

97. Cube 🧊

98. Cylinder

99. Cymbal

100. Cucumber 🥒

101. Celery

102. Cabbage 🥬

103. Cheese 🧀

104. Corn 🌽

105. Carrot 🥕

106. Card 🃏

107. Calculator

108. Candle 🕯

109. Cherry 🍒

110. Cake 🎂

111. Coconut 🥥

112. Cup ☕️

113. Cocoa

114. Can 🥫

115. Calendar 🗓

116. Chef 👨‍🍳

117. Castle 🏰

118. Church ⛪️

119. Cemetery 🪦

120. Cross of Christ ✝️

121. Caravan

122. Circus 🎪

123. Clown 🤡

124. Cricket (game) 🏏

125. Convict

126. Cannon

127. Cow 🐄

128. Chimpanzee

129. Cobra 🐍

130. Cage

131. Canary

132. Check

133. Crossword puzzle

134. Crutch 🩼

135. Cord

136. Crown 👑

137. Crate

138. Cork

139. Cog ⚙️

140. Comb

141. Clarinet

142. Clam

143. Chieftain

144. Cactus 🌵

145. Cliff

146. Chateau

147. Concorde

148. Chandelier

149. Cottage

150. Cigar

151. Candy cane

152. Cauldron

153. Centipede

Dd

154. Dustpan

155. Duster

156. Dynamite 🧨

157. Drill

158. Drawers

159. Draughts

160. Doughnut 🍩

161. Diamond ♦️

162. Dice 🎲

163. Dutch doll

164. Dentures

165. Date (fruit)

166. Date (time) 📅

167. Doily

168. Dish 🍽️

169. Dollar 💵

170. Dolphin 🐬

171. Decagon

172. Devil 😈

173. Dormouse

174. Diagonal

175. Decade

176. Doctrine

177. Dumbbell

178. Dragonfly

179. Dwarf

180. Dachshund

181. Doberman pinscher

182. Dalmatian

183. Dodo 🦤

184. Diplodocus

185. Dimetrodon

186. Dove 🕊

187. Desperado

188. Donkey

189. Dam

190. Drain

191. Dinghy ⛵️

192. Drowning

193. Drawbridge

194. Deer 🦌

195. Destroyer

196. Dromedary

197. Double-decker bus

198. Daffodil 🌼

199. Daisy

200. Dirigible

201. Dominos

202. Dagger 🗡

203. Dart 🎯

204. Duck 🦆

205. Dingo

206. Dolly

207. Deputy

208. Dog 🐶

Ee

208. Eclipse

209. Éclair

210. Elderberries

211. Envelope ✉️

212. Emu

213. Eleven 11

214. Edison

215. Einstein

216. Embryo

217. Earwig

218. Echidna

219. Elf 🧝‍♀️

220. Eskimo

221. Eagle 🦅

222. Edelweiss

223. Earring

224. Emerald

225. Exclamation point ❗️

226. Eyeglasses 👓

Ff

226. Flounder

227. Film 🎞

228. Fly 🪰

229. Foxglove

230. Fern

231. Fairy 🧚

232. Fire 🔥

233. Firewood 🪵

234. Frankenstein

235. Fork

236. Forest

237. Falcon

238. Fungus

239. Flier

240. Flute

241. Fan

242. Foghorn

Gg

243. Graph 📈

244. Glockenspiel

245. Gerbil 🐹

246. Geranium

247. Gladiolus

248. Gladiator

249. Gremlin

250. Golf club

251. Golf ball

252. Gibbon

253. Guitar 🎸

254. Galoshes

255. Grail

256. Greyhound

257. Gong

258. Gazelle

259. Griffin

260. Gargoyle

261. Graffiti

262. Grasshopper

263. Globe 🌎

264. Galleon

265. Gorgon

266. Gnome

267. Gramophone

268. Goat 🐐

269. Goggles 🥽

270. Goose

271. Giraffe 🦒

272. Gazebo

273. Guard 💂‍♀️

274. Gift 🎁

275. Garage

276. Garbage 🗑

277. Garbage can

278. Gallows

279. Guillotine

280. Ghost 👻

281. Giant

282. Goal 🥅

283. Glider

284. Gage

285. Garter

Hh

285. Hexagon

286. Hose

287. Hare

288. Hyena

289. Hawk

290. Hammock

291. Hook 🪝

292. Hippo 🦛

293. Hunter

294. Hill

295. Hang glider

296. Herald

297. Helicopter 🚁

298. Hamburger 🍔

299. Hydrant

300. Hourglass ⌛️

301. Hamster 🐹

302. Hedgehog 🦔

303. Horn 📯

304. Heart ♥️

305. Hen 🐓

306. Hand grenade

307. Humpty-Dumpty

308. Holly

309. Holy Bible

310. Hatch 🐣

311. Haddock

312. Hammer 🔨

313. Hieroglyphics

314. Handkerchief

315. Handcuffs

316. Hatchet 🪓

317. Hornet 🐝

318. Halberd

Ii

318. Island 🏝

319. Icicle

320. Ice cream 🍦

321. Iron

322. Iceberg

323. Icarus

324. Imprisoned

325. Ingot

326. Ink 🖊

Jj

324. Judge 🧑‍⚖️

325. Javelin

326. Jester

327. Jack-in-the-box

328. Jack-in-the-pulpit

329. Japan 🇯🇵

330. Jet ✈️

331. Jasmine

332. Jaguar 🐆

333. Jeans 👖

Kk

333. Kite 🪁

334. Knapsack

335. Knitting

336. Kiwi 🥝

337. Kilt

338. Kitten 🐈‍⬛

339. Knight

340. Kipper

341. Knife 🔪

342. Keys 🔑

343. Keychain

344. Kitchen

345. Kettle

346. Kayak

347. Knocker

348. Ketch

349. Keel

350. Keypad ⌨️

351. Kerb

Ll

350. Ladder 🪜

351. Lyre

352. Lantern

353. Lobster 🦞

354. Llama 🦙

355. Lettuce 🥬

356. Leprechaun 🍀

357. Lockbox

358. Ladle

359. Lemon 🍋

360. Lute

361. Lollipop 🍭

362. Lamp

363. Lily 🪷

364. Lasso

Mm

365. Map 🗺

366. Mammoth 🦣

367. Mermaid 🧜‍♀️

368. Moose

369. Magpie

370. Mosque 🕌

371. Mandolin

372. Monkey 🐒 marionette

373. Marble

374. Metronome

375. Moth

376. Million 1000000

377. Millimeter

378. Millipede

379. Mushroom 🍄

380. Match

381. Matchbox

382. Molecule

383. Mug 🍵

384. Milk 🥛

385. Medal 🏅

386. Monocle 🧐

387. Magnet 🧲

388. Maggot

389. Mask 😷

390. Microphone 🎤

391. Microscope 🔬

392. Moon 🌙

393. Mole

394. Monster 👹

395. Monitor

396. Moustache

Nn

394. Noah

395. Narwhal

396. Neptune

397. Newspaper 📰

398. Nightingale

399. Nest 🪹

400. Net

401. Nun

402. Nut 🌰

403. Nutcracker

404. North

405. Ninety-nine 99

406. Napkin

407. Nautilus

408. Nurse 👩‍⚕️

409. Nonagon

Oo

410. Orange 🍊

411. Otter 🦦

412. Orangutan 🦧

413. Observatory

414. Octagon 🛑

415. Owl 🦉

416. Obelisk

417. Oak

418. Oil drill

419. Organ

420. Oven

421. Orchestra

Pp

421. Purse 👛

422. Physician 🧑‍⚕️

423. Poodle 🐩

424. Parasol ☂️

425. Pig 🐖

426. Perambulator

427. Periwinkle

428. Politician

429. Pin 🧷

430. Philosopher

431. Parchment

432. Polka dot

433. Pigtail

434. Pit drum

435. Pharaoh

436. Pied Piper

437. Pyjamas

438. Plume

439. Police 👮

440. Prisoner

441. Pygmy

442. Punch & Judy

443. Pope

444. Peace ☮️

445. Pirate 🏴‍☠️

446. Patch

447. Peg leg

448. Prince 🤴

449. Princess 👸

450. Pendant

451. Palace

452. Pagoda

453. Parachute 🪂

454. Pegasus

455. Pisa (Leaning Tower)

456. Parthenon

457. Palm tree 🌴

458. Pyramid

459. Paris

460. Peninsula

461. Penguin 🐧

462. Pool 🏊‍♀️

463. Pathway

464. Procession

465. Platypus

466. Pan

467. Pumpkin 🎃

468. Pheasant

469. Partridge

470. Puffin

471. Pelican

472. Porcupine

473. Panda 🐼

474. Parcel 📦

475. Pliers

476. Plow

477. Pitchfork

478. Pick

479. Pine tree 🌲

480. Pansy

481. Poison ivy

482. Periscope

483. Porpoise 🐬

484. Piano 🎹

485. Popeye

486. Phoenix

487. Potato 🥔

488. Plum

489. Painter 👩‍🎨

490. Palette 🎨

491. Paint

492. Paintbrush 🖌

493. Peach 🍑

494. Pear 🍐

495. Pomegranate

496. Pineapple 🍍

497. Pussy-willows

498. Pavilion

499. Pulley

500. Pump

501. Plaque

502. Prism

503. Peas

504. Pearl

Qq

505. Quartz

506. Quicksand

507. Quarter

508. Quoits

509. Queen 👸

510. Quilt

511. Queensland

512. Queue

513. Qantas

514. (Don) Quixote

515. Quiz

516. Questionnaire

Rr

511. Rust

512. Radar

513. Raspberry

514. Raccoon 🦝

515. Rhododendron

516. Roman numerals IVXLCDM

517. Ruby

518. Ring 💍

519. Razor 🪒

520. Roller skate 🛼

521. Reindeer 🦌

522. Roulette

523. Rake

524. Rifle

525. Revolver

526. Refrigerator

527. Rabbit 🐇

528. Rolling pin

529. Register

530. Rose 🌹

531. Raven

532. Ram 🐏

533. Rat 🐀

534. Rowboat 🚣‍♀️

535. Rooster 🐔

536. Rattlesnake

537. Robin

538. Rocking horse

539. Rocking chair

540. Radius

541. Rip

542. Racket

543. Recorder

544. Rocket 🚀

Ss

545. Sapphire

546. Soup 🍲

547. Stump

548. Scorpion 🦂

549. Sieve

550. Sandcastle

551. Sloop

552. Schooner

553. Shark 🦈

554. Scarf 🧣

555. Spider 🕷

556. Spur

557. Sheriff

558. Sling

559. Scab

560. Sickle

561. Scythe

562. Slippers 🥿

563. Sandwich 🥪

564. Sunflower 🌻

565. Snowshoes

566. Skis 🎿

567. Stretcher

568. Spy 🕵️

569. Stitch

570. Screwdriver 🪛

571. Screw

572. Shifter (Wrench)

573. Shrug 🤷‍♀️

574. Spade ♠️

575. Shovel

576. Sledgehammer

577. Scissors ✂️

578. Shears

579. Saw 🪚

580. Scalpel

581. Shack

582. Scooter 🛴

583. Satchel

584. Sundae

585. Straw

586. Spaghetti 🍝

587. Strawberry 🍓

588. Spoon 🥄

589. Saturn 🪐

590. Seesaw

591. Spring

592. Sneeze 🤧

593. Shepherd

594. Staff

595. Scarecrow

596. Sloth 🦥

597. Stork

598. Spoonbill

599. Safe

600. Shrew

601. Skipping rope

602. Scroll 📜

603. Stamp

604. Soccer ⚽️

605. Swimmer 🏊‍♂️

606. Snorkel 🤿

607. Syringe 💉

608. Siphon

609. Stethoscope 🩺

610. Starfish

611. Snail 🐌

612. Slug

613. Sphinx

614. Sprocket ⚙️

615. Spinning wheel

616. Spool 🧵

617. Stool

618. Space shuttle

619. Satellite 🛰

620. Sombrero

621. Serape

622. Saxophone 🎷

623. Synthesizer

624. Superman

625. Shower 🚿

626. Suitcase 🧳

627. Shuttlecock 🏸

628. Skittle (Bowling pin) 🎳

629. Stilts

630. Stalactite

631. Stalagmite

632. Steamroller

633. Swings

634. Slide 🛝

635. Sword ⚔️

636. Sheathe

637. Stiletto

638. Scimitar

639. Saber

640. Spear

641. Sleigh 🛷

642. Snow ❄️

643. Santa Claus 🎅🏻

644. Sack

645. Sausage

646. Stick figure

647. Surfboard 🏄

648. Surfer 🏄‍♂️

649. Seal 🦭

650. Skull 💀

651. Spine

652. Shamrock ☘️

653. Spectacles 🤓

654. Scapula

655. Slingshot

656. Snipe

657. Swallow

658. Sardines

659. Swan 🦢

660. Skunk 🦨

661. Stepladder

662. Sofa 🛋

663. Scarab beetle

664. Stereo

665. Star of David ✡️

666. Sparrow

667. Squirrel 🐿

668. Sextant

669. Squid 🦑

670. Seahorse

671. Salute 🫡

672. Sardines

673. Semaphore

Tt

672. Top hat 🎩

673. Tulip 🌷

674. Tricycle

675. Toad 🐸

676. Thermos

677. Turtle 🐢

678. Tear 💧

679. Trombone

680. Trumpet 🎺

681. Tuba

682. Tractor

683. Trailer

684. Tunnel

685. Tepee

686. Totem pole

687. Target 🎯

688. Tuxedo

689. Tunic

690. Telescope 🔭

691. Teapot 🫖

692. Television 📺

693. Trophy 🏆

694. Tap

695. Teddy bear 🧸

696. Tambourine

697. Torch

698. Toy tank

699. Tomato 🍅

700. Thermometer 🌡

701. Tweezers

702. Threader

703. Typewriter

704. Turntable

705. Telephone ☎️

706. Tapir

Uu

707. UFO 🛸

708. Ursa Major

709. Ursa Minor

710. United Kingdom 🇬🇧

711. Uncle Sam

712. Ukulele

713. Underwear 🩲

714. Umiak

715. Uniform 🥋

716. Unhappy ☹️

Vv

715. Volkswagen

716. Vase 🏺

717. Van 🚐

718. VCR

719. Violin 🎻

720. Vacuum cleaner

721. Voodoo doll

722. Vane

723. Valve

724. Volcano 🌋

725. Viaduct

726. Vicar

727. Viking

728. Vampire 🧛‍♂️

729. Valley

730. Vegetables 🥗

Ww

730. Weevil

731. Wristwatch ⌚️

732. Witch 🧙‍♀️

733. Wave 🌊

734. Wizard 🧙‍♂️

735. Wand

736. Wheat 🌾

737. Wall

738. Wreck

739. Wharf

740. Whale 🐳

741. Walrus

742. Whirlpool

743. Werewolf

744. Wolf 🐺

745. Wishbone

746. Well

747. Washerwoman

748. Washhouse

749. Washing machine

750. Wagon

751. Whip

752. Windmill

753. Wombat

754. Wallaby

755. Weeping willow

756. Waterfall

757. Weapons

758. Water 💧

Xx

757. Xylophone

758. Xerophytes

759. Xmas tree 🎄

760. X-ray 🩻

761. X (sign language)

762. Xanthophyll

763. X (semaphore)

Yy

762. Yoke

763. Yolk

764. Yeti

765. Yeoman

766. Yo-yo 🪀

767. Yard

768. Year

769. S. S. Yoghurt

770. Yabby

Zz

769. Zulu warrior

770. Zodiac

771. Zipper

772. Zinnia

773. Zither

774. Zebu

775. Zorro

776. Zero 0️⃣

777. Zebra 🦓

778. Zoo

Related products
Julia MacRae Books published an Animalia colouring book in 2008. H. N. Abrams also published a wall calendar colouring book version for children the same year.

H. N. Abrams published The Animalia Wall Frieze, a fold-out over 26 feet in length, in which the author created new riddles for each letter.

The Great American Puzzle Factory created a 300-piece jigsaw puzzle based on the book's cover.

Adaptations
A television series was also created, based on the book, which airs in the United States, Australia, Canada, the United Kingdom, Norway and Venezuela. It also airs on Minimax for the Czech Republic and Slovakia. And recently in Greece on the channel ET1. The Australian Children's Television Foundation released a teaching resource DVD-ROM in 2011 to accompany the TV series with teaching aids for classroom use.

In 2010, The Base Factory and AppBooks released Animalia as an application for iPad and iPhone/iPod Touch.

Awards
Animalia won the Young Australian's Best Book Award in 1987 for Best Picture Story Book.

The Children's Book Council of Australia designated Animalia a 1987 Picture Book of the Year: Honour Book.

Kid's Own Australian Literature Awards named Animalia the 1988 Picture Book Winner.

References

External links

 Graeme Base's official website
 A Learning Time activity guide for Animalia created by The Little Big Book Club

Alphabet books
1986 children's books
Picture books by Graeme Base
Puzzle books
Australian children's books
Puffin Books books